Allactaginae is a subfamily of rodents.

Classification 
Subfamily Allactaginae
Genus Allactaga
Subgenus Allactaga
Iranian jerboa, Allactaga firouzi
Hotson's jerboa, Allactaga hotsoni
Great jerboa, Allactaga major
Severtzov's jerboa, Allactaga severtzovi
Subgenus Orientallactaga
Balikun jerboa, Allactaga balikunica
Gobi jerboa, Allactaga bullata
Mongolian five-toed jerboa, Allactaga sibirica
Genus Allactodipus
Bobrinski's jerboa, Allactodipus bobrinskii
Genus Pygeretmus, fat-tailed jerboas
Lesser fat-tailed jerboa, Pygeretmus platyurus
Dwarf fat-tailed jerboa, Pygeretmus pumilio
Greater fat-tailed jerboa, Pygeretmus shitkovi
Genus Scarturus
Small five-toed jerboa, Scarturus elater
Euphrates jerboa, Scarturus euphratica
Four-toed jerboa, Scarturus tetradactyla
Vinogradov's jerboa, Scarturus vinogradovi
Williams' jerboa, Scarturus williamsi

The cladogram below is based on a 2022 phylogenetic study of the nuclear genes by Lebedev et al.

References 

Dipodidae
Mammal subfamilies